Kris Boyd (born September 12, 1996) is an American football cornerback for the Minnesota Vikings of the National Football League (NFL). He played college football at Texas and was selected by the Vikings in the seventh round of the 2019 NFL Draft.

High school career
Boyd attended Gilmer High School in Gilmer, Texas, where he played both running back and defensive back under current UTSA Roadrunners head coach Jeff Traylor. As a sophomore in 2012, he was chosen "Offensive Newcomer of the Year" in District 16-3A after rushing for 1,276 yards and 19 touchdowns and recording 18 tackles and one forced fumble on defense, helping lead Gilmer to a 14-2 record. In his junior season, he was tabbed first-team All-District 16-3A as Gilmer had an 11-2 record, including a 5-1 district mark, and an appearance in the 3A Division 2 regional playoffs in 2013. Boyd totaled 1,052 rushing yards and 808 receiving yards (31 total touchdowns) on offense as a senior. He also recorded 43 tackles, two interceptions, four pass breakups and one fumble recovery on defense, leading Gilmer to a 16-0 record and the 4A Division 2 state championship. Following his senior season, he was selected to participate in the 2015 U.S. Army All-America Bowl.

Boyd was also a standout track and field performer at Gilmer. As a senior, he was a member of the 4x200-meter relay unit that set a record at the 2015 UIL 4A state meet (1:25.49). He was also the runner-up in the 100 meters at that meet with a time of 10.58 seconds.

College career
Boyd played four seasons as a defensive back for the Texas Longhorns. He appeared in 51 games and made 33 starts. Boyd became a starter at cornerback for the Longhorns during his sophomore season, when he started the final eight games of the season and fished sixth on the team with 51 tackles along with an interception, five pass breakups, two forced fumbles, and two fumble recoveries. He collected 191 tackles (141 solo) with four interceptions, 40 passes defended, four forced fumbles and three fumble recoveries. He was named second-team All-Big 12 by the Associated Press after his junior season, when he made 57 tackles with two interceptions and 15 pass breakups. As a senior in 2018, Boyd made 54 tackles, including 4.5 for loss, with one sack first and 15 passes defensed and was named first-team All-Big 12. He was invited to play in the Senior Bowl following his senior season.

Professional career

Minnesota Vikings
Originally projected as a mid-round pick, Boyd slid before being selected in the seventh round (217th overall) of the 2019 NFL Draft by the Minnesota Vikings, joining ex-teammate at Texas and close friend Holton Hill. Boyd signed a four-year, $2.6 million contract with the Vikings on May 5, 2019.

Boyd made his NFL debut against the Atlanta Falcons on September 8, 2019, making two tackles while also drawing two penalties. Boyd finished his rookie season with 22 tackles, one forced fumble and one pass defended.

On December 15, 2020, Boyd was placed on injured reserve with a shoulder injury.

Personal life
Boyd's brother, DeMarco, is a former linebacker on the Longhorns. Two of Boyd's cousins, Bobby Taylor and Curtis Brown, also played in the NFL.

References

External links
Texas Longhorns bio

1996 births
Living people
People from Gilmer, Texas
Players of American football from Texas
American football cornerbacks
Texas Longhorns football players
Minnesota Vikings players